Balakong (Jawi: بالقوڠ) or Cheras South (Jawi: چراس سلتن) is a township in Hulu Langat District, Selangor, Malaysia. Located to the southeast of Greater Kuala Lumpur, the township consists mainly of residential condominiums, office complexes and factories. Notable landmarks in Balakong include AEON Mall Cheras Selatan and Sin Ann Meow Temple (星安庙).

History

Name
According to local Chinese residents, the name Balakong comes from the Chinese New Village, Balakong Chinese New Village. The village was drawn up and barred-wired by the British Empire under the Briggs Plan during the Malayan Emergency. Another belief is that there was a river running through the village named Sungai Balak and that the village adopted the river's name. It is believed that "-Kong" in Balakong comes from the Hakka word for river (江), and Balakong refers to the Hakka pronunciation of the river, Sungai Balak. It is believed that there was an upper and lower kong within the village.

Before 1990s
The village was surrounded by rubber plantation surrounding former tin mines. Most families in the village were rubber tappers. There was a primary school, a few Chinese temples, a wet market, a hilltop Lutheran church, a cowboy town street, a town hall, and a football field. The village was divided by Sungai Balak.

After 1990s
During Taming Jaya's development, locals mentioned that the developer of Taming Jaya rebuilt Balakong Road into a two-lane highway starting at The Mines and terminated at Cheras 11th Mile. A newer road was constructed that connected the village to Taman Connaught. Taming Jaya's developer also had developed a small-industry area and housing estate on a rubber plantation opposite the village. Since the early 2010's, Balakong has seen rapid commercial development in the form of Dataran C180 and Cheras Traders Square.

Education

List of schools in Balakong

Primary Schools 
Sekolah Jenis Kebangsaan (Cina) Balakong

Sekolah Jenis Kebangsaan (Cina) Batu 11 Cheras

Sekolah Jenis Kebangsaan (Cina) Connought 2

Sekolah Kebangsaan Bandar Tun Hussein Onn

Sekolah Kebangsaan Bandar Tun Hussein Onn 2

Sekolah Kebangsaan Cheras Jaya

Sekolah Kebangsaan Desa Baiduri

Sekolah Kebangsaan Taming Jaya

Secondary Schools 
Sekolah Menengah Kebangsaan Bandar Damai Perdana

Sekolah Menengah Kebangsaan Bandar Tun Hussein Onn 2

Sekolah Menengah Kebangsaan Cheras Jaya

Sekolah Menengah Kebangsaan Cheras Perdana

Sekolah Menengah Kebangsaan Perimbun

Politics 
Balakong is represented in the Dewan Rakyat of the Malaysian Parliament by as part of the Bangi federal constituency. Syahredzan Johan of DAP has represented the constituency since 2022.

On the state level, Balakong is represented in the Selangor State Legislative Assembly by Wong Siew Ki of DAP since the 2018 Balakong by-election after the death of the incumbent assemblyman Eddie Ng Tien Chee.

On the local level, Balakong is administered by the Kajang Municipal Council.

Infrastructure

Transportation
Balakong is accessible via the Balakong Interchange of SILK toll road , which connects the Besraya toll road  near Seri Kembangan in the west to the Grand Saga toll road  (part of the National Route 1 system). The township has since developed into an integrated township with residential, commercial and industrial areas.

Public transport
The MRT Kajang Line, running parallel to National Route 1, serves the locality via the Bandar Tun Hussein Onn and Cheras 11 Miles stations. Opened in 2017, they are part of the Klang Valley Integrated Transit System. Cheras 11 Miles station is located at Balakong Interchange of the Grand Saga toll road.

Shopping
AEON Mall Cheras Selatan is the largest mall in the town, while nearby malls include BMC Mall, AEON BIG Bandar Tun Hussein Onn and Econsave.

Healthcare
Kajang Hospital is the nearest public hospital. The private Columbia Asia Hospital opened in Cheras 11 Miles in 2010.

References

External links

Hulu Langat District
Townships in Selangor